Two ships of the Royal Australian Navy have been named HMAS Jervis Bay, for Jervis Bay on the south coast of New South Wales.
, a roll-on/roll-off ferry acquired by the RAN in 1977, used as a logistics and training ship, and sold back into civilian service in 1994.
, a wave piercing catamaran acquired in 1999, used as a fast troop transport, and returned to civilian service in 2001.

Battle honours
One battle honour has been awarded to ships named HMAS Jervis Bay:
 East Timor 1999–2000

See also
, a British armed merchant cruiser operated during World War II

References

Royal Australian Navy ship names